Gopi Talav or Gopi Lake is a lake in the Gopipura locality in the city of Surat in Gujarat state of India. It was built in circa 1510 CE by Malik Gopi, who was an affluent merchant and governor of Surat during the Gujarat Sultanate. In 2012, the lake was renovated by Surat Municipal Corporation and the area surrounding it was redeveloped as a recreational facility.

History
Malik Gopi, a Brahmin merchant, settled in Surat and the development of the city has been attributed to his contributions. The area he developed was called Gopipura, in his honour and the king of Gujarat gave him the title of "Malik". The town that he developed was still unnamed and consulting astrologers he proposed to name it "Suraj" or "Suryapur". The king disliking the Hindu inclination of the name altered it to "Surat" (meaning headings of the chapters of the Quran). Gopi also finds mentions in Portuguese literature as "Lord of Surat and Bharuch".

In 1573, Emperor Akbar had set up his military base camp near the lake during the siege of Surat.

Sanskrit poet Vinayavijaya (1613–1681) in his poem "Indudutam" calls this lake a "fine art emerged from the churning of oceans." The lake also finds mentions in travelogues of European visitors. British traveler Peter Mundy who arrived in Surat in September 1628 describes the lake as "the Great Tancke of Surat," and "admirable for its workemannshipp and bignes". Dutch geographer Joannes de Laet's 1631 Latin works mention this lake to have been cut out of a rock. Johan Albrecht de Mandelslo, a German adventurer who landed in Surat in 1638 describes the vastness of the lake along with steps surrounding it and mentions the house that stood at the centre; wrongly calling it "the tomb of the builder of this magnificent structure". Portuguese Jesuit Manoel Godinho toured the Surat region in 1662–63 and mentions two wells outside the city used to supply drinking water and this is implied as a reference to two cisterns of the lake. The lake also finds mentions in the chronicles of Italian traveler Pietro della Valle as "Gopi Telau". Sir Thomas Herbert, who toured India on various occasions in 15th century, mentions the lake to have been used to hold rain water for drinking purpose.

In 1666, French traveler Jean de Thévenot in his writings notes the absence of restorations required for the lake. By 1674, the lake had been ignored and had turned dry turning to ruins by 1717. Further in the 20th century, the steps surrounding this dry lake made it look like a huge amphitheater.

Renovation and redevelopment 
{
  "type": "FeatureCollection",
  "features": [
    {
      "type": "Feature",
      "properties": {
        "marker-symbol": "circle",
        "marker-size": "small",
        "title": "Entry Gate"
      },
      "geometry": {
        "type": "Point",
        "coordinates": [
          72.828287,21.189663
        ]
      }
    },
    {
      "type": "Feature",
      "properties": {
        "marker-symbol": "water",
        "marker-size": "small",
        "title": "Gopi Talav"
      },
      "geometry": {
        "type": "Point",
        "coordinates": [
          72.829330,21.188850
        ]
      }
    },
    {
      "type": "Feature",
      "properties": {"marker-symbol": "square",
        "marker-size": "small",
        "title": "Step-Well"},
      "geometry": {
        "type": "Point",
        "coordinates": [
          72.828188,21.188937
        ]
      }
    },
    {
      "type": "Feature",
      "properties": {"marker-symbol": "restaurant",
        "marker-size": "small",
        "title": "Food-park"},
      "geometry": {
        "type": "Point",
        "coordinates": [
          72.830116,21.187638
        ]
      }
    },
    {
      "type": "Feature",
      "properties": {"marker-symbol": "circle",
        "marker-size": "small",
        "title": "Viewing Deck"},
      "geometry": {
        "type": "Point",
        "coordinates": [
          72.829899,21.188572
        ]
      }
    } 
  ]
}
Around  of land was renovated, where the  diameter lake covered almost  of area. The lake can hold  of water. The renovated surroundings include amphitheater and fountain plaza. The area has been divided into seven zones; the diamond zone, food zone, environment zone, history zone, communal harmony zone, textile zone and  Surat nu Jaman. The first phase was inaugurated on 5 December 2015 by Chief Minister of Gujarat, Anandiben Patel.

The redevelopment of the lake and the park around it is based on the renovation of Kankaria Lake in Ahmedabad. Water to the lake will be piped from the Tapi river on whose banks the city lies.

Gallery

Notes
 Caste of Malik Gopi is unclear and has been described as Nagar Brahmin or Anaavla Brahmin. 
 The king at the time has been disputed and has been described to be Mahmud Begada or his son, Muzaffar Shah II in various accounts.

See also
 List of tourist attractions in Surat
 Tapi Riverfront
 Suvali Beach
 Dumas Beach

References 

History of Surat
Tourist attractions in Surat
Lakes of Gujarat
16th-century architecture
Geography of Surat